Pelter Glacier is a glacier about  long on Thurston Island, flowing from the east side of Noville Peninsula into the west side of Murphy Inlet. Delineated from air photos taken by U.S. Navy Squadron VX-6 in January 1960. Named by Advisory Committee on Antarctic Names (US-ACAN) for J.A. Pelter, aerial photographer with the Byrd Antarctic Expedition in 1933–35.

See also
 List of glaciers in the Antarctic
 Glaciology

Maps
 Thurston Island – Jones Mountains. 1:500000 Antarctica Sketch Map. US Geological Survey, 1967.
 Antarctic Digital Database (ADD). Scale 1:250000 topographic map of Antarctica. Scientific Committee on Antarctic Research (SCAR). Since 1993, regularly upgraded and updated.

References
 

Glaciers of Thurston Island